Chegeni-ye Olya (also Romanized as Chegenī-ye ‘Olyā; also known as Chegīnī) is a village in Sanjabi Rural District, Kuzaran District, Kermanshah County, Kermanshah Province, Iran. At the 2006 census, its population was 140, with 34 families.

References 

Populated places in Kermanshah County